Colton Beck (born June 10, 1990) is a Canadian professional ice hockey player who is currently playing with  Tampereen Ilves of the Liiga -League.

Playing career
Prior to playing for the Alaska Nanooks, Beck played for the Langley Chiefs of the British Columbia Hockey League (BCHL). After completion of his college career, he signed with the Idaho Steelheads of the ECHL in 2014. In January 2016, Beck signed with the Iowa Wild of the American Hockey League (AHL).

During the 2018–19 season, on November 1, 2018, Beck signed a two-year, two-way contract with Iowa's parent affiliate, the Minnesota Wild of the National Hockey League (NHL).

As a free agent after five seasons with the Iowa Wild, Beck was left unsigned with the delayed 2020–21 North American season due to the COVID-19 pandemic. On December 10, 2020, Beck agreed to a one-year contract with German second tier club, EV Landshut of the DEL2, however with concerns over his family's health with the birth of a newborn, and the commencement of a lockdown through Germany, Beck was released from his contract on December 16, 2020.

On February 12, 2021, having returned to Canada, Beck was signed to a professional tryout contract with the Stockton Heat of the AHL. Remaining with the Heat for the shortened 2020–21 season, Beck collected 1 goal and 6 points in 21 games. 

As a free agent, Beck decided to recommit to a European career, agreeing to a one-year contract with Austrian based club, Dornbirn Bulldogs of the ICEHL, on August 25, 2021.

Personal life
Beck's father, Murray, was drafted 104th overall by the Houston Aeros in the 1974 WHA Amateur Draft. His uncle, Barry, played in the NHL from 1977 to 1990.

Career statistics

References

External links
 

1990 births
Living people
Alaska Nanooks men's ice hockey players
Canadian ice hockey left wingers
Ice hockey people from British Columbia
Idaho Steelheads (ECHL) players
Iowa Wild players
Langley Chiefs players
St. John's IceCaps players
Stockton Heat players